Clear is the second EP by American progressive metal band Periphery. It was released on January 28, 2014 through Sumerian Records. This EP is an experimental work for the band: aside from the intro track, each member of the band composed a track and covered the role of creative director over that track.

Background 
Jake Bowen stated:

This EP has no artwork, by choice of the band. A preview of "Feed the Ground" surfaced in 2012 originally as a demo for Spencer Sotelo and Matt Halpern's project King Mothership.

Track listing

Personnel 
Production and performance credits are adapted from the album liner notes.

Periphery
 Spencer Sotelo — vocals
 Misha "Bulb" Mansoor — guitar
 Jake Bowen — guitar
 Mark Holcomb — guitar
 Adam "Nolly" Getgood — bass
 Matt Halpern — drums

Additional musicians
 Nick Johnston — guitar solo on "The Parade of Ashes"

Production
 Misha "Bulb" Mansoor — engineering, mixing on "Overture", "The Summer Jam", "Zero", "Pale Aura"
 Adam "Nolly" Getgood — mastering on "Overture", "The Summer Jam", "Zero", "Extraneous", "Pale Aura"; engineering, mixing on "Extraneous"
 Spencer Sotelo — production on "Feed the Ground", "The Parade of Ashes"; vocal production
 Matt Halpern — production on "Feed the Ground"
 Taylor Larson — production, recording, engineering, mixing, mastering on "Feed the Ground", "The Parade of Ashes"
 Ernie Slenkovich — additional engineering on "Feed the Ground", "The Parade of Ashes"

Studios
 Top Secret Audio — engineering, mixing, mastering of "Overture", "The Summer Jam", "Zero", "Extraneous", "Pale Aura"
 Oceanic studios — recording, mixing, mastering of "Feed the Ground", "The Parade of Ashes"

Charts

References 

2014 EPs
Periphery (band) albums
Sumerian Records albums
Century Media Records albums